Carole Ann Lillian Ford ( Higgins; born 16 June 1940) is a British actress best known for her roles as Susan Foreman in the BBC science fiction television series Doctor Who, and as Bettina in the 1962 film adaptation of The Day of the Triffids.

Life and career 
Ford has had a long and diverse acting career. Her theatrical work includes many comedies, dramas and musicals, including The Jungle Book, Stranger in the House, Bakerloo to Paradise, The Owl and the Pussycat, The Rumpus, Pride and Prejudice, Inadmissible Evidence, Enrico, Expresso Bongo, Sleeping Beauty, You Never Can Tell, Ned Kelly, Mother, MacBett, The Boy Friend, Have You Seen Manchester and Private Lives.

Her film appearances include The Day of the Triffids (1962) as the blind French girl Bettina, Mix Me a Person (1962), The Great St Trinian's Train Robbery (1966), The Hiding Place (1975) and The Incredible Sarah (1976). In addition to Doctor Who, her television appearances include Suspense (in the episode "Man on a Bicycle"), Whatever Happened to the Likely Lads? (in the episode "Affairs and Relations"), Public Eye, Emergency Ward 10, Attorney General, Moonstrike, Compact, Probation Officer and Dial M for Murder (1967).

Ford appeared on Juke Box Jury and various quiz shows, and has performed many voice-overs and voice dubs.

Doctor Who 
According to the documentary Doctor Who: Origins, an appearance on Z-Cars prompted Ford's screen test for the role of Susan in Doctor Who in 1963. Playing the granddaughter of the Doctor, Ford was one of the three original companions to accompany William Hartnell's incarnation of the Time Lord. According to Ford, Susan was originally intended to be a character similar to those in The Champions, with telepathic abilities as well as the skills to fly the TARDIS, but in the series she was made to be far more ordinary. Her character departed from the series at the conclusion of the 1964 serial The Dalek Invasion of Earth, but returned briefly for both the series's 20th-anniversary TV special, The Five Doctors (1983), and 30th-anniversary charity special, Dimensions in Time (1993). She appeared as a different character in the independent Doctor Who spin-off film Shakedown: Return of the Sontarans (1995).

Ford mostly stopped acting following an illness in 1977 which led to a dramatic weight reduction and the loss of her voice  (it recovered later). Since then, she taught voice and presentation skills and dialogue coaching to politicians, businesspeople, after-dinner speakers, and actors. Since the 2000s, however, she has made a limited return to the profession, reprising the role of Susan in a number of Doctor Who audio plays by Big Finish Productions (some of which have been broadcast on BBC Radio): two Doctor Who Unbound stories, Auld Mortality and A Storm of Angels; two Companion Chronicles stories, Here There Be Monsters and Quinnis; and three stories also featuring the Doctor, starting with the subscription-only release An Earthly Child, in which her character is reunited with Paul McGann's Eighth Doctor, followed by Relative Dimensions and Lucie Miller.

She was played by Claudia Grant in the BBC Two docu-drama An Adventure in Space and Time, which dramatises the story of the conception of Doctor Who and was broadcast on 21 November 2013 to complement the series' 50th-anniversary special. Ford herself appeared in a small role as a character named Joyce.

In November 2013, Ford appeared in the one-off 50th-anniversary comedy homage The Five(ish) Doctors Reboot.
Ford also narrated the behind the scenes look at the making of An Adventure In Space And Time, "The Making of Doctor Who". She examines the making of Doctor Who and what it was like to work with William Hartnell (the First Doctor).

Filmography

Film

Television

References

External links 

1940 births
20th-century British actresses
21st-century British actresses
British film actresses
British radio actresses
British stage actresses
British television actresses
British voice actresses
British voice coaches
Living people
People educated at Barking Abbey Grammar School
People from Ilford
Actresses from Essex
20th-century English women
20th-century English people
21st-century English women
21st-century English people